Albas may refer to:

Albas, Aude, a commune in the Aude department, France
Albas, Lot, a commune in the Lot department, France

People with the surname
Dan Albas (born 1976), Canadian politician
Samuel Albas (1697–1749), Moroccan rabbi